John F. Kennedy Stadium, formerly Philadelphia Municipal Stadium and Sesquicentennial Stadium, was an open-air stadium in Philadelphia that stood from 1926 to 1992. The South Philadelphia stadium was on the east side of the far southern end of Broad Street at a location now part of the South Philadelphia Sports Complex. Designed by the architectural firm of Simon & Simon in a classic 1920s style with a horseshoe seating design that surrounded a track and football field, at its peak the facility seated in excess of 102,000 people. Bleachers were later added at the open (North) end.  The shape of the stadium resembles the horseshoe configuration of Harvard Stadium built in 1903.  

Each section of the main portion of the stadium contained its own entrance, which displayed the letters of each section above the entrance, in a nod to ancient Roman stadia. Section designators were divided at the south end of the stadium (the bottom of the "U" shape) between West and East, starting with Sections WA and EA and proceeding north. The north bleachers started with Section NA.

It was built of concrete, stone, and brick on a  tract.

Opening and names
Leaders of Philadelphia's sports organizations gathered at the Philadelphia Chamber of Commerce in March 1920 and announced their intention to build a 200,000 seat sports stadium to attract national and international sporting events. The city immediately submitted its candidacy to host the 1924 Summer Olympics. At the time, the University of Pennsylvania's Franklin Field was the city's largest ballpark with a capacity of 30,000 seats; the Philadelphia Athletics' Shibe Park sat 23,000, and the Phillies' National League Park sat 18,000. The initial meeting in 1920 favored building the stadium as a memorial to the nation's war dead and placing it in Fairmount Park at its entrance to the Benjamin Franklin Parkway.

The stadium was built as part of the 1926 Sesquicentennial International Exposition. Originally known as Sesquicentennial Stadium when it opened April 15, 1926, the structure was renamed Philadelphia Municipal Stadium after the Exposition's closing ceremonies. In 1964, it was renamed John F. Kennedy Stadium in memory of the 35th President of the United States who had been assassinated the year before.

Football
The stadium's first tenants (in 1926) were the Philadelphia Quakers of the first American Football League, whose Saturday afternoon home games were a popular mainstay of the Exposition. The Quakers won the league championship but the league folded after one year.

The Frankford Yellow Jackets also played here intermittently until the team's demise in 1931. Two years later, the National Football League awarded another team to the city, the Philadelphia Eagles.  The Eagles had a four-season stint as tenants of the stadium before moving to Shibe Park for the 1940 season, although the team did play at Municipal in 1941. The Eagles also used the stadium for practices in the 1970s and 1980s, even locating their first practice bubble there before moving it to the Veterans Stadium parking lot following the stadium's condemnation.

The stadium became known chiefly as the "neutral" venue for a total of 41 annual Army–Navy Games played there between 1936 and 1979. The streak was briefly broken during World War II, when travel restrictions forced three games to be held on campus and one game to be played in Baltimore. From 1960 to 1970 the stadium served as Navy's home field when they played Notre Dame. It also hosted the Notre Dame-Army game in 1957, marking the only time the Cadets have hosted the Fighting Irish outside of New York or New Jersey. The Pennsylvania Railroad and its successors, Penn Central and Conrail, offered game-day service to all Army-Navy games, using a sprawling temporary station constructed each year on the railroad's nearby Greenwich freight yard. The service, with 40-odd trains serving as many as 30,000 attendees, was the single largest concentrated passenger rail movement in the country.

A.F. "Bud" Dudley, a former Villanova University athletic-director, created the Liberty Bowl in Philadelphia in 1959. The game was played at Municipal Stadium and was the only cold-weather bowl game of its time. It was plagued by poor attendance; the 1963 game between Mississippi State and NC State drew less than 10,000 fans and absorbed a loss in excess of $40,000. The Liberty Bowl's best game was its first in 1959, when 38,000 fans watched Penn State beat Alabama 7–0. However, even that crowd was swallowed up in the environment. Atlantic City convinced Dudley to move his game from Philadelphia to Atlantic City's Convention Hall for 1964. 6,059 fans saw Utah rout West Virginia in the first indoor bowl game. Dudley moved the game to Memphis in 1965 where it has been played since.

The stadium hosted Philadelphia's City Title high school football championship game in 1939 and 1978. St. Joe's Prep defeated Northeast, 27-6, in 1939. Frankford beat Archbishop Wood, 27-7, in heavy rain in 1978.

On September 16, 1950, the Cleveland Browns, playing their first season in the NFL after dominating the defunct All-America Football Conference (winning all four league titles), played their first NFL game against the two-time defending NFL Champion Philadelphia Eagles as a prelude to what would eventually in time become the NFL Kickoff Game. Philadelphia was the center of the professional football universe at the time; not only did the city host the defending NFL champions, but the league offices were also in town, headed up by NFL commissioner (and Philadelphia native) Bert Bell. To accommodate the anticipated ticket demand, the game was moved from Shibe Park; this proved to be a wise decision, as the contest drew a then NFL-record 71,237—nearly doubling the Eagles' prior attendance mark of 38,230. Many thought Bell had scheduled this game of defending league champions to teach the upstarts from the AAFC a lesson. Instead, the Browns shredded the Eagles' vaunted defense in a 35-10 rout, and went on to win the NFL Championship that first year in the league.

In 1958, some 15,000 fans attended a CFL game between the Hamilton Tiger-Cats and the Ottawa Rough Riders with proceeds from ticket sales going to local charities. (Hamilton won, 24-18, in what remains the only regular-season CFL game played between two Canadian teams outside of Canada.)

The stadium was home to the Philadelphia Bell of the World Football League in 1974. The Bell seemed to give the WFL instant credibility when it announced a crowd of 55,534 for the home opener, and 64,719 for the second home game. However, when the Bell paid city taxes on the attendance figures two weeks later, it emerged that the gates had been wildly inflated. The team sold block tickets to area businesses at a discount, and the tax revenue was not reported. In turn, many of these businesses gave away the tickets for free. The actual paid attendance for the home opener was only 13,855, while the paid attendance for the second game was only 6,200—and many of those tickets were sold well below face value. The "Papergate" scandal made the Bell and the WFL look foolish, and proved to be a humiliation from which neither recovered. The team played at Franklin Field in 1975; the league folded late into that season.

Other sports
On September 23, 1926, an announced crowd of 120,557 packed the then-new Stadium during a rainstorm to witness Gene Tunney capture the world heavyweight boxing title from Jack Dempsey. Undefeated Rocky Marciano knocked out Jersey Joe Walcott at the stadium on September 23, 1952 to win boxing's heavyweight championship.

On June 26, 1957, a 150-lap NASCAR convertible race was held at the Stadium, which was won by Bob Welborn in a 1957 Chevrolet.

JFK Stadium hosted Team America's soccer match against England on May 31, 1976, as part of the 1976 U.S.A. Bicentennial Cup Tournament. In the game, England defeated Team America, 3-1, in front of a small crowd of 16,239. England and Italy had failed to qualify for the 1976 European Championship final tournament and so they joined Brazil and Team America, composed of international stars playing in the North American Soccer League, in the four team competition. Because Team America was composed of international players and was not the American national team, the Football Association does not regard England's match against Team America as an official international match.

JFK Stadium was one of fifteen United States stadia (and along with Franklin Field, also in Philadelphia) inspected by a five-member FIFA committee in April 1988 in the evaluation of the United States as a possible host of the 1994 FIFA World Cup. By the time the World Cup was held in 1994, JFK Stadium had already been demolished two years prior.

Other events
The Philadelphia Flyers won their second Stanley Cup on May 27, 1975, and celebrated with a parade down Broad Street the next day that ended at the stadium. Five years later, the Philadelphia Phillies won their first World Series on October 21 of that year. The following day, the team paraded the exact route.
In 1981, The Rolling Stones announced their World Tour via a press conference at JFK.
Through 1989, the Broad Street Run course ended with a lap around the track at the stadium.

Concerts

JFK Stadium occasionally hosted rock concerts:

The Supremes appeared in concert here on September 10, 1965.

The Beatles played their second and final Philadelphia concert here on August 16, 1966.

Judy Garland gave her last concert in America here in 1968, singing in part with the Count Basie band.

Yes, Peter Frampton, Gary Wright, and others  played the "1976 Bicentennial Concert" here on June 12, 1976, to 105,000 fans.

Led Zeppelin was scheduled to conclude their 1977 US Tour at the stadium, but the final 7 concerts of the tour were cancelled, due to the death of Robert Plant's 5-year-old son Karac. The original Led Zeppelin never played in the US again, although the surviving members performed at Live Aid.

Peter Frampton returned from a 7-month lay-off and played with Lynyrd Skynyrd, The J. Geils Band and Dickey Betts & Great Southern, before 91,000 fans, on June 11, 1977.

On June 17, 1978, The Rolling Stones performed in front of 90,000 fans. Opening acts included Bob Marley's former bandmate Peter Tosh and Foreigner. 

On Saturday June 20, 1981, a concert called The Roundup, which included bands .38 Special, Marshall Tucker Band, Molly Hatchet, The Outlaws and the Allman Brothers, took place in one of the original All Day concert events starting at 10 a.m.

Another all-star show was staged at JFK on July 30, 1978 that featured the Sanford-Townsend Band, Bob Welch, Steve Miller Band and Fleetwood Mac. The Bob Welch and Steve Miller sets were marred by PA system problems. The Fleetwood Mac set was marred by the unreliable vocals of Stevie Nicks, who was disinterested at best and off-key or off-tempo at worst. The rest of the band was strong, however, especially Lindsey Buckingham's guitar work and Christine McVie's vocals.

The Rolling Stones opened their 1981 American Tour ("Tattoo You") with two shows at JFK Stadium, on September 25 and 26, 1981 in front of 90,000 fans each night. Opening acts were Journey and George Thorogood & the Destroyers. (The Stones pre-opened the tour with a warm-up show at the Sir Morgan's Cove club in Worcester, Massachusetts, on September 14, 1981.) Mick Jagger met the press at JFK Stadium on August 26, 1981, to announce the tour. Apparently in honor of the old stadium's football heritage and the Eagles' recent NFC championship, Jagger—who performed in something resembling a pair of football trousers and knee pads for much of the tour—at one point donned an Eagles jersey that became part of his '81-'82 stage wardrobe.

On June 19, 1982, an all-day show opened with a still mostly unknown Huey Lewis & the News and featured Joan Jett & the Black Hearts, Loverboy, The Kinks and headliner Foreigner, who were touring their 7x-platinum "4" album and inflated a colorful, 30-foot-high facsimile of a Wurlitzer-style jukebox as they performed "Juke Box Hero" in the show's final minutes.

On July 3, 1982, Rick James performed in concert at JFK Stadium, called "The Throwdown in Phillytown." Also featured were Frankie Beverly and Maze, Kool and the Gang, Atlantic Starr, and One Way featuring Al Hudson.

Blondie concluded their Tracks Across America Tour here, on August 21, 1982. They disbanded shortly thereafter, due to guitarist Chris Stein being diagnosed with a rare life-threatening disease, pemphigus and The Hunter having sold very poorly. They did not perform live again for 15 years, until 1997. Genesis was the headliner and used the open air stadium for one of their spectacular nighttime laser and fireworks shows. The show started at 3pm and also featured Elvis Costello & The Attractions, A Flock of Seagulls, and Robert Hazard & The Heroes.

The Who performed at the stadium on September 25, 1982, early into their (then) Farewell Tour which also supported their album It's Hard. Opening acts for the show were Santana, The Clash, and The Hooters. A total of 91,451 were in attendance, one of the largest ticketed single-show, non-festival stadium concerts ever held in the U.S., as documented by Billboard.

Journey headlined a concert June 4, 1983. The show featured Bryan Adams, The Tubes, Sammy Hagar and John Cougar (as John Mellencamp was referred to at the time). This show provided the majority of the concert footage for an NFL Films produced documentary, called Journey, Frontiers and Beyond.

On August 20, 1983, The Police headlined another "JFK Jam" as these multi-act, all-day shows were being referred to.  This time the opening acts were R.E.M., Madness, and Joan Jett.

Pop group The Jacksons performed for 4 sold-out shows in September 1984 during their Victory Tour in front of 200,000 in attendance, one of the largest audiences of the tour.

Live Aid was primarily a dual-venue concert held on July 13, 1985. The event was held simultaneously on the American side at JFK Stadium (attended by 89,484 people) and on the UK side at Wembley Stadium, in London (attended by 72,000 people), as well as other venues in other countries. Musical acts that appeared in Philadelphia included Madonna, Tom Petty and the Heartbreakers, REO Speedwagon, The Hooters, Bryan Adams, Eric Clapton, The Cars, Black Sabbath, Judas Priest, the surviving members of Led Zeppelin, Crosby, Stills, Nash & Young, Mick Jagger, Tina Turner and Bob Dylan, accompanied by Keith Richards and Ronnie Wood, of The Rolling Stones. Phil Collins performed at Wembley Stadium, traveled by helicopter to Heathrow Airport, flew to Philadelphia via Concorde supersonic jet and performed at JFK Stadium.

Bob Dylan and The Grateful Dead performed on July 10, 1987 in front of 70,000-plus on a day when it was 90 °F in the shade (they were spraying fans near the stage with water). The day John Hammond died.

U2 performed at the stadium on September 25, 1987, during their Joshua Tree Tour, in front of a crowd of 86,145 people.

Pink Floyd held a concert on September 19, 1987, in front of a crowd in excess of 120,000 (general admission was sold on the field), but the show was not sold out.

The stadium played host to the Monsters of Rock Festival Tour, featuring Van Halen, Scorpions, Dokken, Metallica and Kingdom Come, on June 11, 1988.

The stadium also played host to Amnesty International's Human Rights Now! benefit concert on September 19, 1988, for which attendance was about 80,000 people. The show was headlined by Bruce Springsteen and the E Street Band and also featured Sting, Tracy Chapman, Peter Gabriel, Youssou N'Dour and Joan Baez.

It was not known at the time, but the stadium's last event was a Grateful Dead concert on July 7, 1989, with Bruce Hornsby & The Range as their opening act. Fans at the show recall concrete crumbling and bathrooms in poor shape. The Dead closed the show with "Knockin' on Heaven's Door"; it would be the last song played at the stadium. In 2010, the concert recording was released on a CD/DVD combination, titled Crimson White & Indigo.

On August 28, 29, and 30, 1989, in preparation for opening their 1989 Steel Wheels tour in Philadelphia (Veterans Stadium, August 31, 1989), the Rolling Stones set up their stage inside JFK Stadium for two full dress-rehearsal performances on August 28 and 29, 1989. A few dozen fans were allowed to enter the stadium to attend these rehearsals.

Closing and demolition
Six days after the Grateful Dead's 1989 show, then-Mayor Wilson Goode condemned the stadium due to multiple findings by city inspectors that the structure was structurally unsafe and a potential fire hazard. Just hours before the concert, city inspectors had discovered piles of combustible materials, numerous electrical problems, and crumbling and/or falling concrete. By this time, some 20,000 people were already in the stadium, with another 20,000 in line waiting to enter. The Grateful Dead were only allowed to perform due to strict no-smoking regulations that had been enacted some time before. 

While renovation and repairs of the stadium were discussed, this was quickly rejected due to the exceedingly high costs, and it was demolished on September 23, 1992.

The 1993 Philadelphia stop for the Lollapalooza music festival was held at the JFK Stadium site on July 18, 1993. The site was an open field, as construction had not yet begun on the then still tentatively named "Spectrum II" (Wells Fargo Center). This was the show at which Rage Against the Machine stood on stage without playing in protest of the Parents Music Resource Center.

The Wells Fargo Center now stands on the site, which is part of the complex that also includes Lincoln Financial Field and Citizens Bank Park.

See also

 List of memorials to John F. Kennedy

References

Further reading
Essay about Pink Floyd at July 24, 1968 Summer Music Festival at JFK Stadium

External links
 Grateful Dead's July 7, 1989 JFK Concert
 Site of JFK/Municipal Stadium via Google Maps
 Aerial photograph of JFK/Municipal Stadium in 1927

American Football League (1926) venues
Army–Navy Game
Philadelphia Eagles stadiums
Villanova Wildcats football
World Football League venues
Boxing venues in Philadelphia
Defunct college football venues
Defunct National Football League venues
Defunct NCAA bowl game venues
Defunct sports venues in Philadelphia
Defunct soccer venues in the United States
Demolished sports venues in Pennsylvania
Former music venues in the United States
Soccer venues in Pennsylvania
South Philadelphia
Monuments and memorials to John F. Kennedy in the United States
Event venues established in 1926
Sports venues completed in 1926
Sports venues demolished in 1992
1926 establishments in Pennsylvania
1992 disestablishments in Pennsylvania